Ziemiełowice Palace (Polish: Pałac w Ziemiełowicach) - a historical building, located in Ziemiełowice in Namysłów County, Poland. Since 2006, the palace has been owned by the Praski family from Opole, which has successively restored the castle into a classic example of a palace-garden complex prevalent across the nineteenth-century, retaining its Eclecticist character.

References

Castles in Opole Voivodeship
Namysłów County